Johann Christoph Fugger (1561-1612) was a German businessman and the last famous survivor of the Fugger vom Reh branch of the Fugger family. He was employed at the royal court in Prague. In 1603 he married Regina Greiner. Johann Christoph was a member of the German nobility. His grandfather, Gastel Fugger, got a patent of nobility in 1547. Johann Christoph Fugger had no descendants. Contemporary members of the Fugger vom Reh are descendants of Matthäus Fugger (1442-1489/92). The current head of the family is Markus Fugger von dem Rech (born 1970).

Family tree

Johann Christoph
1561 births
1612 deaths